Up & Down is an album by American jazz pianist Horace Parlan featuring performances recorded in 1961 and released on the Blue Note label.

Reception
The Allmusic review by Stephen Thomas Erlewine awarded the album  stars and stated that "it finds Parlan at a peak, and in many ways, coming into his own as a pianist and a leader".

Track listing
All compositions by Horace Parlan except as indicated

 "The Book's Beat" (Booker Ervin) - 9:50
 "Up and Down" - 6:11
 "Fugee" (George Tucker) - 7:04
 "The Other Part of Town" (Grant Green) - 11:40
 "Lonely One" (Babs Gonzales) - 4:06
 "Light Blue" (Tommy Turrentine) - 6:03
 "Fugee" [alternate take] (Tucker) - 7:01 Bonus track on CD reissue

Personnel
Horace Parlan - piano
Booker Ervin - tenor saxophone
Grant Green - guitar
George Tucker - bass
Al Harewood - drums

References

1961 albums
Blue Note Records albums
Horace Parlan albums
Albums produced by Alfred Lion
Albums recorded at Van Gelder Studio